Interfoto Picture Library Ltd v Stiletto Visual Programmes Ltd [1987] EWCA Civ 6 is an English contract law case on onerous clauses and the rule of common law that reasonable notice of them must be given to a contracting party in order that they be effective. It also addressed, but did not decide, the position of onerous clauses as disguised penalties (which are ineffective at common law).

Facts
Interfoto delivered 47 photographic transparencies to Stiletto in a jiffy bag. Stiletto was planning to use them for a presentation, but in the event it did not. It never opened the transparency bag or read Interfoto's standard terms and conditions, which were inside the bag. Condition 2 said there was a holding fee of £5 per transparency for each day over fourteen days. After around a month, Interfoto sent a bill for £3,783.50.

Judgment
The Court of Appeal held that the holding fee was ineffective. Dillon LJ said that a ‘particularly onerous or unusual’ term must have special notice. However, Interfoto was entitled to a small restitutory charge of £3.50 per transparency per week for their holding.

Bingham LJ held that the clause was not valid. It was ‘a venial period of delay [for] an inordinate liability.’ The issue was, he said,

He advocated embracing good faith - ‘showing up your cards’, ‘fair dealing’, and so on. On penalty clauses, Bingham LJ noted at the end of his decision,

See also
O’Brien v MGN Ltd [2002] CLC 33, [23], Hale LJ said the words ‘onerous or unusual’ are not ‘terms of art’
OFT v Abbey [2008] EWHC 875 (Comm)

Notes

English incorporation case law
Court of Appeal (England and Wales) cases
1987 in case law
1987 in British law